Allison Kopf is founder and CEO of the enterprise Cultivation Management Platform (CMP) Artemis (formerly known as Agrilyst). Kopf is also  Investment Partner at XFactor Ventures and serves on boards related to companies and organizations in the education and science sectors such as Santa Clara University and SCU Ciocca Center.

Early life and education 
Kopf was born and raised in New York, and went to Santa Clara University and gained her bachelors of science degree within physics.

Career 
In 2008, while gaining her degree, Kopf started her professional career in the solar industry, where she became the project manager for the California entry into the Solar Decathlon, a design and engineering competition. Kopf and her team raised over $1.2 million over two years and designed and built a solar-powered fully functional home.

In 2011, Kopf  joined the American indoor farming company BrightFarms. During this time, Kopf worked as the company's Real Estate and Government Relations Manager, where she aided in scaling up projects in addition to focusing on how the organisation could improve operational performance of each site.

In 2015, Kopf left her position at BrightFarms and founded Agrilyst, a web-based  Cultivation Management Platform (CMP).  The  business intelligence platform to increase efficiency within the agriculture and farming industry, by pulling in data from sensors in greenhouses and information about crop yields and other metrics. Within the same year of the start up, Agrilyst won TechCrunch Disrupt's start up competition. As of 2019 Agrilyst's customer base consisted of 50% cannabis industry customers to aid in crop growth and maintenance.

During 2018, Kopf joined XFactor Ventures, a start up investment company that focuses on women and mixed gender team founders. she focuses primarily on investing in organisations based within fields of future of work, enterprise SaaS, agtech, and deep tech.

During 2021, Artemis was acquired by iUNU, a developer of  greenhouse management platforms, at which point Kopf became Chief Growth officer for the organisation.

Recognition 
In 2016, Kopf was named Entrepreneur of the Year by technical.ly Brooklyn for her efforts in the newfound field of digital horticulture.

Following this in 2016, Kopf was named Change Maker of the year for her work within the digital horticulture industry by the Association for Vertical Farming.

In 2019, Kopf was named one of the winners of the Women of Influence award by the New York Business Journal and Bizwomen.

In 2021, Kopf was named the winner of the Woman of Impact award from Global Women Fresh, an event that brings together women in produce to close the gender divide within the industry.

Personal life 
Kopf resides in Brooklyn, New York.

References

External links 

21st-century American businesswomen
21st-century American businesspeople
1990 births
Living people
Santa Clara University alumni
Businesspeople from Brooklyn